The Grote Prijs Jean-Pierre Monseré is a one-day cycling race held annually in Belgium, named after Jean-Pierre Monseré. It is part of UCI Europe Tour in category 1.1.

Winners

References

Cycle races in Belgium
UCI Europe Tour races
Recurring sporting events established in 2012
2012 establishments in Belgium